Kentinkrono is a town in Kumasi in the Ashanti Region of Ghana. It is about 20 kilometres from the centre of Kumasi. It is a dormitory town. It serves mainly as a community in the city of Kumasi, with old and modern buildings.

Boundaries
The town is bordered on the south by KNUST campus, to the West by Kotei, to the east by Ayigya and to the South by Oduom.

References

Populated places in Kumasi Metropolitan Assembly